DIQ, diq or Diq may refer to:

 Divinópolis Airport, Brazil (by IATA code)
 Zazaki language, spoken in Turkey (by ISO 639 code)
 Diagnostic Impotence Questionnaire
 Reko Diq, a town in Pakistan
 Dinagaon Station, India (code DIQ)